Ken Marks (born 13 December 1951) is a former Australian rules footballer who played with Footscray in the Victorian Football League (VFL).

Marks started his league career at Fitzroy and was a Morrish Medal winner in the 1970 VFL Under 19's competition. A rover, he never played a senior game for Fitzroy. He made three appearances with Footscray in the 1972 VFL season.

The following year he joined Preston, without a clearance, and finished third in the J. J. Liston Trophy in 1976.

References

External links
 
 

1951 births
Western Bulldogs players
Preston Football Club (VFA) players
Australian rules footballers from Victoria (Australia)
Living people